Kristín Vala Ragnarsdóttir (born 1954) is an Icelandic Earth and sustainability scientist and activist who is a professor of Earth Sciences at the Faculty of-  and Institute of Earth Sciences, University of Iceland. She was the first woman to be a full professor in Earth Sciences at the University of Bristol, UK and at the same time the first woman to become a full professor in the Science Faculty there. She was also the first woman to serve as Dean of a School at the University of Iceland.

Kristín Vala is a member of Academia Europaea (since 2012), the Norwegian Academy of Science and Letters, and the Icelandic Academy of Science. She is a fellow of the Royal Society of Arts, distinguished fellow of the Schumacher Institute, and a member of and the Wellbeing Economy Alliance. She is a member of the sustainability think tanks the Balaton Group and the Club of Rome.

Career

Appointments 
Kristín Vala was on the faculty of Earth Sciences at the University of Bristol for 20 years, starting as researcher and becoming professor first of Environmental Geochemistry and then Environmental Sustainability. In 2008 she joined the University of Iceland as Dean of the School of Engineering and Natural Sciences, and in 2012 the Faculty of Earth Sciences as Professor.

Board memberships 
Kristín Vala was a board member of the Geological Society of London the European Association of Geochemistry, and the Schumacher Society (now Schumacher Institute). She was member of the steering committee of the Balaton Group, and the Alliance for Sustainability and Prosperity (ASAP). She was also on the board/steering group of TreeSisters, Pyramid2030, 17Goals, Health Empowernment Through Nutrition, Framtíðarlandið (FutureIceland), Initiative for Equality, Landvernd (Nature Protection) and Landsvirkjun (National Energy).

Kristín Vala is scientific advisor to the Ecological Sequestration Trust, serves on the global council of Wellbeing Economy Alliance (WEAll) and is a board member of Breiddalssetur Science and Culture Centre, and the Red Cross.

Editorial memberships 
Kristín Vala was a member of the editorial boards of eEarth, Geochemical Transactions, Geochimica et Cosmochimice Acta and Chemical Geology.

Currently she is a member of the editorial boards of Anthropocene Review, System Change, BioPhysical Economics and Sustainability (previously BioPhysical Economics and Resource Quality), and Solutions (for a Sustainabile and Desirable Future).

Background

Training 
Kristín Vala trained in geochemistry and petrology at the University of Iceland and geological sciences at Northwestern University, Evanston, Illinois.

Awards 
Kristín Vala received the Award of Excellence Furthering Sustainability and Equality Learning from the Schumacher Institute. She was co-recipient of Times Higher Education Supplement (THES) Award to the University of Bristol for Outstanding Contribution to Sustainable Development.

Expert member panels 
Kristín Vala was a member of the UN Environment Program Depleted Uranium Scientific Assessment Teams, Kosovo (2000) and Bosnia Herzegovina (2002). She was a member of the International Expert Working Group of the Government of Bhutan on the New Development Paradigm (2013) and represented Academia Europaea in the European Academies Scientific Advisory Council (EASAC) working group on the Circular Economy (2016).
 
In Iceland Kristín Vala has advised the government on issues relating to higher education and research, education for sustainability, climate strategy, prosperity, quality of life and wellbeing, and energy policy.

Research 
During her career, Kristín Vala has published over 100 research articles, book chapters, and books and has been awarded prizes and memberships/fellowships by academies and sustainability think tanks.
 
Among many other topics, Kristín Vala has published work on geothermal systems, mineral solubility, mineral dissolution kinetics, structure and coordination of aqueous species, sorption of aqueous species to mineral surfaces, backfill materials for radioactive waste disposal, link between environment and health, bacterial and fungal weathering, and critical zone processes.

At the turn of the century, Kristín Vala's research turned to issues related to transdisciplinary sustainability science, including city carbon emission management, natural resource availability and management, soil sustainability, sustainable tourism, and achieving the UN Sustainability Goals through the wellbeing economy.

Politics 
Kristín Vala is a member of the Pirate Party and has been influential in developing its policies relating to environment, climate, and sustainability. She was instrumental in facilitating the participation of the Icelandic government in joining the Wellbeing Economy Governments (WEGo).

Selected bibliography

Books 
Ragnarsdottir K.V. and Banwart S.A. (editors) (2016) Soil: The Life Supporting Skin on Earth. eBook University of Iceland and University of Sheffield.  
Plant J.A., Voulvoulis N. and Ragnarsdottir K.V. (editors) (2011)  Pollutants, Human Health and the Environment. A Risk Approach.  Wiley Blackwell, 356 pages.
Hancock P.L. and Skinner B.J. (editors), D.l. Dineley (associate editor) and Dawson A.G., Ragnarsdottir K.V. and Steward I.S. (subject editors) (2000)  The Oxford Companion to the Earth, 1174 pp.  Oxford University Press.

Book Chapters 
Lohrenz U., Sverdrup H.U. and Ragnarsdottir K.V. (2018) Global megatrends and resource use - A systemic reflection. In H. Lehmann (ed) Factor X. Eco-Efficiency in Industry and Science vol 32. Springer, Berlin. 
Thorarinsdottir, R., Coaten, D., Pantanella, E., Shultz, C., Stander, H. and Ragnarsdottir, K.V. (2017) Renewable energy use for aquaponics development on global scale towards sustainable food production. In J. Bundschuh, G. Chen, D. Chandrasekharam, J. Piechocki (Eds.) Geothermal, Wind and Solar Energy Applications in Agriculture and Aquaculture, Sustainable Energy Development Series, CRC Press, 362 pages.

References 

Kristín Vala Ragnarsdóttir
Kristín Vala Ragnarsdóttir
Women earth scientists
Sustainability scientists
Kristín Vala Ragnarsdóttir
Academics of the University of Bristol
Northwestern University alumni
Kristín Vala Ragnarsdóttir
Members of Academia Europaea
Members of the Norwegian Academy of Science and Letters
Living people
1954 births